Bourges is a commune in central France on the river Yèvre. It is the capital of the department of Cher, and also was the capital city of the former province of Berry.

History

The name of the commune derives either from the Bituriges, the name of the original inhabitants, or from the Germanic word Burg (French: bourg; Spanish: burgo; English, others: burgh, berg, or borough), for "hill" or "village". The Celts called it Avaricon; Latin-speakers: Avaricum.  In the fourth century BC, as in the time of Caesar, the area around it was the center of a Gallic (Celtic) confederacy.

In 52 BC, the sixth year of the Gallic Wars, while the Gauls implemented a scorched-earth policy to try to deny Caesar's forces supplies, the inhabitants of Avaricum begged not to have their town burned. It was temporarily spared due to its good defences provided by the surrounding marshes, by a river that nearly encircled it, and by a strong southern wall. Julius Caesar's forces, nevertheless, captured and destroyed the town, killing all but 800 of its inhabitants.

Rome reconstructed Avaricum as a Roman town, with a monumental gate, aqueducts, thermae and an amphitheatre; it reached a greater size than it would attain during the Middle Ages. The massive walls surrounding the late-Roman town, enclosing 40 hectares, were built in part with stone re-used from earlier public buildings.

The third-century AD Saint Ursinus, also known as Saint Ursin, is considered the first bishop of the town. Bourges functions as the seat of an archbishopric. During the 8th century Bourges lay on the northern fringes of the Duchy of Aquitaine and was therefore the first town to come under Frankish attacks when the Franks crossed the Loire. The Frankish Charles Martel captured the town in 731, but Duke Odo the Great of Aquitaine immediately re-took it. It remained under the rule of counts who pledged allegiance to the Aquitanian dukes up to the destructive siege by the Frankish King Pepin the Short in 762, when Basque troops are found defending the town along with its count.

During the Middle Ages, Bourges served as the capital of the Viscounty of Bourges until 1101. In the fourteenth century, it became the capital of the Duchy of Berry (established in 1360). The future king of France, Charles VII, sought refuge there in the 1420s during the Hundred Years' War. His son, Louis XI, was born there in 1423. In 1438, Charles VII decreed the Pragmatic Sanction of Bourges. During this period, Bourges was a major centre of alchemy.

The Gothic Cathedral of Saint Étienne, begun at the end of the twelfth century, ranks as a World Heritage Site. It is considered one of the earliest examples of the High Gothic style of the thirteenth century.

Bourges has a long tradition of art and history. Apart from the cathedral, other sites of importance include the 15th-century Palais Jacques Cœur and a sixty-five-hectare district of half-timbered houses and fine town-houses.

Population

Geography
Bourges sits at the river junction where the Auron flows into the Yèvre. The disused Canal de Berry follows alongside the course of the Auron through Bourges.

Climate

Bourges, located in the center of France, away from the Atlantic Ocean, features a typical degraded oceanic climate (Köppen: Cfb), characterized by colder, drier winters and warmer, wetter summers than the oceanic climate.

Sights

Its Gothic cathedral (built 1195–1255) was added to the list of the World Heritage Sites by UNESCO in 1992
Palais Jacques Cœur
Lallemant's hotel, from the early French Renaissance
The Berry museum, located in the Cujas' hotel
The Estève museum, located in the so-called aldermen's hotel
The marshes of the Yèvre and Voiselle rivers were listed in 2003 as a French Natural Monument or Site
The ruins of the Gallo-Roman walls
The Conservatoire national du Pélargonium

Transport

The Bourges station offers direct railway connections to Orléans, Tours, Lyon and several regional destinations. The A71 motorway connects Bourges with Orléans and Clermont-Ferrand. Bourges Airport is a small regional airport.

Sport and recreation
Bourges' principal football team are Bourges Football 18. It is also home to the women's basketball club CJM Bourges Basket, which has won multiple titles in domestic and European basketball.
Bourges XV is the premier rugby team in the region, currently playing in French National Division, Federal 3.

Colleges and universities
 University of Bourges
 École des Beaux Arts
 Ecole Nationale Supérieure d'Ingénieurs ENSI

Twin towns – sister cities

Bourges is twinned with:
 Augsburg, Germany
 Aveiro, Portugal
 Forlì, Italy
 Koszalin, Poland
 Palencia, Spain
 Peterborough, United Kingdom
 Yoshkar-Ola, Russia
 Korosten, Ukraine

Events
The Printemps de Bourges music festival takes place in Bourges every year.

Every summer, and since 2002, Les mille univers hosts a writing workshop in collaboration with Oulipo.

Personalities 
 16th-century poet and translator Pierre Motin was born in Bourges.
 17th-century composer and singer François Bourgoing was born in Bourges.
 The merchant Jacques Cœur was born in Bourges.
 The manuscript illuminator Jean Colombe maintained a workshop in Bourges.
 John Calvin was a student in the University of Bourges.
 The legal expert Jacques Cujas lived in Bourges during 1555-1557 and 1575–1590.
 Eustadiola (594–684) was a saint and abbess.
 The Impressionist painter Berthe Morisot was born in Bourges on 14 January 1841.
 The Art Nouveau sculptor Julien Caussé was born in Bourges in 1869.
 The philosopher Vladimir Jankélévitch (1903-1985) was born in Bourges.
 The writer and historian Jules Bertaut (1877–1959) was born in Bourges.
 Béatrice Vialle, aviator.
 Emmanuel Imorou, footballer.
 Émilienne Demougeot (1910–1994), historian, was born in Bourges.
 The mother of fictional character Gabrielle Maple hailed from Bourges in The Petrified Forest (1936), endearingly mispronounced "Boorgs" by the actress playing the part, Bette Davis.
 François Jacques (1946–1992), historian, was born in Bourges.
 Arnaud Courlet de Vregille (1958-), painter, was born in Bourges.
 Belle du Berry( born Bénédicte Grimault) ( 1966-2020) lead singer of Paris Combo

See also
Saint-Benoît-du-Sault
Communes of the Cher department

References

Bibliography

External links

 Official website

 
Burial sites of the House of Albret
Communes of Cher (department)
Prefectures in France
Berry, France
Bituriges Cubi
Gallia Aquitania